Calle Lindström (1868–1955) was a Swedish singer and comedian from Östergötland.

Career
Trained as a stucco worker, Lindström eventually left that line of work to become a bondkomiker (peasant comic) and bygdemålstalare (dialect storyteller). In 1901 he appeared for the first time at the newly dedicated folk park in Norrköping.  He took part in local revues there for many years, and was on the folk park circuit until the end of the 1940s. A long-term contract enabled him to become one of Sweden's most prolific recording artists with over two hundred sides to his credit. His motto was: "Above all else, be original!" 

Calle Lindström had perhaps the most varied background of any peasant comic.  Born in 1868, in his youth he was a circus artist, who worked in every facet of the entertainment industry. The concertina was his instrument as he regaled audiences despite missing four fingers on his right hand — he had to turn the instrument upside down and hide the disfigured hand with a handkerchief.  He sometimes used a method of presentation called the "tintamarresque theater".  A common practice in Swedish variety halls, the performer would stand behind a photographed foreground and slip his head through an opening in the picture for comic effect.

Lindström's 1908 recording of Chikago achieved popularity on both sides of the Atlantic. The song, whose music and lyrics he wrote, has been recorded by many artists since then and published in Swedish and American songbooks.

Chicago was one of the major urban centers for Swedish immigrants. Lasse from Ossebo, the character in the song, has heard many marvelous things about Chicago from his brother who lives there. He is impressed by the stockyards and the elevated railway, but perhaps even more by the fact that "at night it's just like daytime, there are so many lights" — and "everybody smokes cigars instead of chewing snuff." Lasse decides to go there himself: "And there I'll make my fortune and be a proper gent. Good-bye to each and all of you, it's time now that I went!" 

The humorist Albert Engström coined the word "Grönköping" in 1895 as a caption for some of his drawings, thereby inventing the fictional Swedish town of the same name. In 2002 the CD Grönköping Tar Ton was issued in Sweden to commemorate one hundred years of Grönköpings Veckoblad (Grönköping's Weekly), a satirical monthly magazine that was founded in 1902. The album, depicting Grönköping in recordings made between 1908 and 1946, has two recordings by Calle Lindström .

Legacy
Calle Lindström never visited the United States, but some of his songs and stories made the journey.  Several of his recordings were repackaged for the American market and issued on Victor Records. Songs such as Sven Svenssons Sven and Josefin mä symaskin (Josefin with the sewing machine) were recorded in New York City by other Swedish-born artists. In 1972 the Swedish actor John Harryson released cover versions of  two songs written by Lindström. More than a half century after his death there continues to be interest in Lindström's recordings, which are sold in the original vinyl format and as digital downloads  or posted on video-sharing websites.

Selected discography
 
Cecilia Vals: John Harryson 1972 
Chikago: Anne-Charlotte Harvey 1996 
Chikago: John Berquist and the South Side Swedes 2001 
Chikago: Lucas Stark och Bruksorkestern 2009 
Grönköping Tar Ton: various artists 2002 
Josefin (with the sewing machine): Jack Pearson 2000 
Mitt Handklaver: John Harryson 1972

Selected bibliography
Emigrantvisor 1981: Swedish lyrics for Chikago and musical notation 
Mel Bay's Immigrant Songbook 1992: Swedish and English lyrics for Chikago, guitar chords and piano arrangement 
Mike and Else's Swedish Songbook 1997: Swedish and English lyrics for Chikago, guitar chords and piano arrangement

References

External links

Calle Lindström
Image files
Calle Lindström on Victor Records.
Calle Lindström's tintamarresque theater
John Harryson LP
Grönköping CD
Selected recordings (Sweden)
Chikago 1908
Josefin mä symaskin 1911
Korperal Storm
Sven Svenssons Sven 1914
Swedish discography
Calle Lindström at the Swedish media database.
Selected recordings (America)
Sven Svenssons Sven 1921
Josefin mä symaskin 1928
Bert Leman songbook 1928 Josefin mä symaskin did not have words and music by Bert Leman. The lyricist was Skånska Lasse.
Song lyrics
Chikago
Josefin mä symaskin 
Korperal Storm by Gustaf Fröding
Sven Svenssons Sven
Songbook
Calle Lindström songbook
Streaming audio
När ja' va'te Stockholm at the National Library of Sweden.
Sven Svenssons Sven at the Library of Congress.
Calle Lindström at the Internet Archive.

1868 births
1955 deaths
People from Norrköping
Swedish comedy writers
Swedish entertainers
Swedish songwriters
Swedish-language writers